Robert Henry Wishart Shepherd (1888–1971) was a 20th-century Scots-born minister and biblical scholar serving in South Africa firstly for the United Free Church of Scotland then for the Church of Scotland. He served as Moderator of the General Assembly of the Church of Scotland in 1959. He was Director of the Lovedale Mission from 1930 to 1955.

Life

He was born near Dundee in Scotland in 1888. He was ordained as a minister in the United Free Church of Scotland in 1918 and sent to South Africa as a missionary in 1920. In 1929 the United Free Church merged with the Church of Scotland and Shepherd was thereafter a Church of Scotland minister/missionary. He moved to the Lovedale Mission soon after the merge.

In 1932 he also took over as main editor of the Lovedale Press and the South African Outlook. In these he specifically promoted African writing and African self-consciousness, promoting a new-born pride in being a black South African.

He went from South Africa to Scotland in 1955 and served as Moderator in 1959/60 being succeeded by Very Rev J. H. S. Burleigh. His role during the year included membership of the Monckton Commission looking at the Federation of Rhodesia with Nyasaland. The Nyasaland debates ended in the creation of Malawi. He returned to South Africa in 1960/61 as minister of the Presbyterian Church in Alice.

He died in South Africa in 1971.

Publications

The Bantu 1927

Though Mountains Shake 1940

References

External links
Biography at biblicaltraining.org

1888 births
1971 deaths
20th-century Christian biblical scholars
British biblical scholars
Calvinist and Reformed biblical scholars
Moderators of the General Assembly of the Church of Scotland
Ministers of the United Free Church of Scotland
20th-century Ministers of the Church of Scotland